Vishnyakovsky is a rural locality (a khutor) and the administrative center of Vishnyakovskoye Rural Settlement, Uryupinsky District, Volgograd Oblast, Russia. The population was 326 as of 2010. There are 9 streets.

Geography 
Vishnyakovsky is located in forest steppe, 21 km northeast of Uryupinsk (the district's administrative centre) by road. Nizhnekrasnyansky is the nearest rural locality.

References 

Rural localities in Uryupinsky District